Major-General Charles Frederick Torrens Daniell  (21 August 1827 – 26 July 1889) was a British Army officer who held high office in the 1880s.

Military career
Born in Berkhamsted in Hertfordshire, the youngest son of Thomas Daniell of Aldridge Lodge, Staffordshire and Little Berkhamsted in Hertfordshire and of Mary née Smith of the Smith banking family, Daniell was commissioned into the 38th Regiment of Foot.

In 1884 he was invited to command an Infantry Brigade at Malta and then in 1886 he was appointed General Officer Commanding Northern District. He remained in this post until 1889.

Family
In 1849, he married Charlotte Vernon and then in 1856 he married Mary Smith.

References

External links

 

1827 births
1889 deaths
British Army major generals
Companions of the Order of the Bath
People from Berkhamsted
People from South Kensington
Military personnel from Hertfordshire